Leucoagaricus barssii is a species of fungus in the family Agaricaceae. It is commonly known as the smoky dapperling.

Taxonomy 
Originally classified as Lepiota barssii by the American mycologist Sanford Myron Zeller in 1934 and reclassified as Leucoagaricus barssii by the mycologist Else C. Vellinga in 2000.

The type species of the Leucoagaricus genus, Leucoagaricus macrorhizus was reclassified as Leucoagaricus barssii.

Description 
Leucoagaricus barssii is a large dapperling mushrooms with white flesh.

Cap: 4-8cm. Starts convex before becoming depressed. May also present as slightly umbonate. It is fibrous with scattered scales. Stem: 4-8cm. Tapers towards the base and possesses a wide annulus. Gills: White or cream in colour and attached freely with a collar. Spore print: creamy white. Spores: Ovoid and smooth. Dextrinoid. 7-8 x 5-5.5 μm. Taste: Indistinct. Smell: Pleasant and fresh.

Habitat and distribution 
L. barssii is reported as being widespread but rarely recorded in the United Kingdom. Observations of it appear to be uncommon in Europe with the most common locations for purported observations being the West Coast of the United States.

References 

barssii
Taxa described in 1934